Microsoft Flight Simulator, commonly known as Microsoft Flight Simulator 1.0, is a flight simulator video game, released in November 1982 for the IBM PC. It is the first release in the Microsoft Flight Simulator series.

History

Around the years of 1981–82, Microsoft contacted Bruce Artwick of Sublogic, creator of FS1 Flight Simulator, to develop a new flight simulator for IBM compatible PCs. This version was released in November 1982 as Microsoft Flight Simulator.  It featured an improved graphics engine, variable weather and time of day, and a new coordinate system (used by all subsequent versions up to version 5).  It was later updated and ported to other home computers as Flight Simulator II, published by Sublogic.

Advertisements claimed "If flying your IBM PC got any more realistic, you'd need a license", and promised "a full-color, out-the-window flight display". Early versions of Microsoft Flight Simulator were used as a test for PC compatibility. If a computer could run Microsoft Flight Simulator and Lotus 1-2-3, it was 100% IBM PC-compatible.

Gameplay
In Microsoft Flight Simulator (1.0), the player flies a Cessna 182 in one of four US regions: Chicago, Los Angeles, New York City, or Seattle.  The starting airport was Meigs Field in Chicago, with a view of the city skyline to the left and Lake Michigan to the right.  It would remain the default airport in future versions of Microsoft Flight Simulator, until the real airport was closed.

There was also a "Europe 1917" mode which was similar to the "British Ace" mode of FS1 Flight Simulator.  This mode had the player flying a Sopwith Camel in a grid-divided area with mountains on two sides.  They could declare war and fire at enemy aircraft.

Reception
Will Fastie for Creative Computing said "In their established tradition, Microsoft has again chosen to market a classic program, unique in the market."

Jay Marrone for SoftSide said "the MS-Flight Simulator is an entertaining program for anyone who ever wanted to pilot an airplane."

Hartley G. Lesser for Electronic Fun with Computers & Games said "Microsoft's Flight Simulator actually turns your IBM PC into a Cessna. The thrill of flying becomes a reality."

Stan Miastkowski for Byte said "The Microsoft Flight Simulator is a tour de force of the programmer's art."

The game sold about 800,000 copies in its first five years.

In 2021, The Strong National Museum of Play inducted Microsoft Flight Simulator to its World Video Game Hall of Fame.

Reviews
PC Magazine - Jan, 1983

References

External links
Microsoft Flight Simulator 1.0 at MobyGames
Review in PC World
Review in Family Computing

1982 video games
Microsoft Flight Simulator
Video games developed in the United States
Video games set in the United States
World Video Game Hall of Fame